WSVT-LD, virtual channel 18 (UHF digital channel 23), is a low-powered Daystar-owned-and-operated television station licensed to Tampa Bay, Florida, United States. The station is owned by the Word of God Fellowship.

Daystar reached a deal to sell WSVT-CD, along with WUDT-CD (channel 23) in Detroit, to LocusPoint Networks in December 2012. The deal will make WSVT a sister station to WARP-CD (channel 20), which LocusPoint acquired a month earlier. In the meantime, in May 2013, Daystar surrendered the class A status for WSVT and three other stations.

References

External links 

SVT-LD
Daystar (TV network) affiliates
Television channels and stations established in 1992
Low-power television stations in the United States